Triple Play 97 is the second video game in the Triple Play series, published in 1996. The game's cover features Hall of Famer Tony Gwynn of the San Diego Padres.

Development
The game was announced at E3 1996.

Reception

In 1998, PC Gamer declared it the 39th-best computer game ever released, and the editors called it "Triple Play 97 is fast, addictive, and, with its terrific presentation and two-man commentary, immerses the player in that authentic day-at-the-ballpark atmosphere like no other". 

IGN praised the graphics.

Reviews
Electric Playground - September 10, 1996
Entertainment Weekly - August 16, 1996
Computer Gaming World - November 1996
Computer Games Magazine - September 26, 1996
PC Gamer - November 1996

References

1996 video games
DOS games
PlayStation (console) games
Triple Play video games
Video games set in 1997
Video games developed in the United States
Windows games